Claim to Fame is an American reality competition series that premiered on ABC on July 11, 2022. The series is hosted by Kevin Jonas and Frankie Jonas. In January 2023, the series was renewed for a second season.

Format
Twelve contestants, each of whom has a famous relative, move into a house together and are tasked with deducing which celebrities the other contestants are related to while also keeping their own celebrity relationship a secret. Every episode, the contestants participate in a competition. The winner is granted immunity for the round and a bonus clue about another contestant.

At the end of the episode, the contestants secretly vote between the two lowest-ranked performers in the competition to be the round's "guesser". The guesser will then choose any other non-immune contestant and announce which celebrity they think the other contestant is related to. If the guesser is correct, the other contestant will be eliminated; if the guesser is wrong, the guesser will be eliminated instead.

The final contestant remaining wins $100,000.

Contestants

Contestant progress

Key
 The contestant won the challenge, was safe for the week, and received a clue about one of the other contestants.
 The contestant was one of the bottom two from the challenge. 
 The contestant was the guesser, attempted to identify the contestant's celebrity relative, and were safe because they were correct.
 The contestant was selected by the guesser, but because the guesser guessed incorrectly and was eliminated, this contestant was saved.
 The contestant was one of the bottom two from the challenge, was voted by the other contestants to be the guesser, and was eliminated because the guess was incorrect.
 The contestant was eliminated by the guesser correctly identifying their celebrity relative.
 The contestant was disqualified from the game.

Production
On March 23, 2022, it was announced that ABC had ordered the series with Kevin Jonas and Frankie Jonas as hosts. On April 7, 2022, it was announced that the series would premiere on July 7, 2022.

On January 11, 2023, the series was renewed for a second season.

Episodes

Reception

Critical
Stephanie Morgan of Common Sense Media gave the series two stars out of five and said that the show will, "appeal only to viewers old enough to recognize the celebrities referenced," adding on, "many of the celebrities are either too niche, or too old, for younger viewers to recognize -- making the big reveals less and less satisfying." Entertainment Weekly described the show as, "a bit of a Frankenstein's monster — part Big Brother, part The Masked Singer, a pinch of The Other Two", saying that, "It's almost impossible not to play along".

Notes

References

External links

2020s American reality television series
2022 American television series debuts
American Broadcasting Company original programming
English-language television shows
Reality competition television series
Television series by Disney